Chorrera extrincica is a species of snout moth in the genus Chorrera. It was described by Harrison Gray Dyar Jr. in 1919 and is found in the United States on the Florida Keys and Cuba.

The larvae feed on Waltheria indica.

References

Moths described in 1919
Phycitinae